67th Street may refer to:

67th Street (Manhattan), New York City
67th Street (IRT Third Avenue Line), New York City